Fares Ibrahim Saed Hassouna El-Bakh (born 4 June 1998), commonly known as Meso Hassouna, is a Qatari  weightlifter, Olympic Champion, World Champion and two time Junior World Champion competing in the 85 kg, and 94 kg categories until 2018 and 96 kg and 102 kg starting in 2018 after the International Weightlifting Federation reorganized the categories.

He holds the junior world record in the clean & jerk (225 kg) and total (397 kg) in the 96 kg division. His father, Ibrahim Hassouna, represented Egypt at three consecutive Olympics from 1984 to 1992.

Career

Olympics
He initially placed eighth at the men's 85 kg event at the 2016 Summer Olympics, but was updated to seventh after the original bronze medalist Gabriel Sîncrăian failed a drug test in October of that year. At the 2020 Summer Olympics in Tokyo, he competed in the 96 kg category. After the snatch portion of the competition, he was in fourth place with a 177 kg lift, although the difference between first and fifth place was just 2 kg. In the clean & jerk section, he attempted his first lift after every competitor had finished their lifts. He successfully lifted 217 kg, clinching the gold medal, he followed himself with an Olympic record lift of 225 kg, which gave him a total of 402 kg (also an Olympic record). He attempted, but failed a world record lift of 232 kg, his total of 402 kg was 15 kg greater than the silver and bronze medalists. With his Olympic gold, he became the first Qatari Olympic Champion, regardless of sport.

World Championships
In 2017 he moved up to the 94 kg category and competed at the 2017 World Weightlifting Championships, where he won a silver medal in the clean & jerk and originally placed fourth overall, but was upgraded to a bronze medal in the total after the original silver medalist Aurimas Didžbalis was disqualified after failing a drug test.

The next year he competed in the 2018 World Weightlifting Championships, where he a bronze medal in the clean & jerk portion in the new 96 kg category. During the competition he set a new junior world record in the clean and jerk.

Other competitions
He competed at the 2016 Junior World Weightlifting Championships and won a bronze medal in the total in the clean & jerk and total in the 85 kg category. The following year he competed again at the Junior World Weightlifting Championships this time he got a gold medal in the 85 kg category.

In 2018 he defended his title as Junior World Champion, he won a gold medal at the Junior World Weightlifting Championships in the 94 kg category. He also won the Asian Junior Championships in the 94 kg division, later in 2018 he competed at the 2018 Asian Games and won the silver medal in the 94 kg category. At the 5th International Qatar Cup he swept gold in the 96 kg class, where he set a junior world records in the clean & jerk with 225 kg and total with 397 kg.

Major results

References

External links
 
 
 
 
 

1998 births
Living people
Qatari male weightlifters
Qatari people of Egyptian descent
Olympic weightlifters of Qatar
Weightlifters at the 2016 Summer Olympics
World Weightlifting Championships medalists
Asian Games medalists in weightlifting
Asian Games silver medalists for Qatar
Weightlifters at the 2018 Asian Games
Medalists at the 2018 Asian Games
Weightlifters at the 2020 Summer Olympics
Olympic gold medalists for Qatar
Medalists at the 2020 Summer Olympics
Olympic medalists in weightlifting